The 1995 Clásica de San Sebastián was the 15th edition of the Clásica de San Sebastián cycle race and was held on 12 August 1995. The race started and finished in San Sebastián. The race was won by Lance Armstrong of the Motorola team.

General classification

References

Clásica de San Sebastián
San
Clasica De San Sebastian
August 1995 sports events in Europe